Trois-Rives is a municipality with an area of  located in Mékinac Regional County Municipality, in the Mid-Mauricie, province of Quebec, Canada.

Geography
It is bounded on the west by the Saint-Maurice River, and includes the communities of Grande-Anse, Olscamps, Rivière-Matawin, Saint-Joseph-de-Mékinac, and partially Rivière-aux-Rats.

The territory also includes in the east portions of Mékinac Lake (in part), Missionary Lake (in part), aux Loutres, and Dumont Lakes.

The toponym "Trois-Rives" (three banks) refers to the three rivers that drain the territory: the Matawin River, the Saint-Maurice River and the Mékinac River.

History
It was established in 1972 as Boucher, named after the geographic township of Boucher in which it is located. This name was chosen in honour of Pierre Boucher, former French governor of Trois-Rivières and owner of the Boucher and Boucherville Seignories in the late 17th century. It was not until 1978 that the municipal incorporation was confirmed.

On December 26, 1998, the municipality was renamed to Trois-Rives (French for "Three shores") to better represent the geography of the municipality as it is crossed by three rivers: the Matawin, the Mékinac, and the Saint-Maurice River.

On August 28, 2004, Trois-Rives was enlarged by some  when it annexed a portion of the Lac-Masketsi Unorganized Territory.

The municipality has two main roads: Quebec Route 155 (along the Saint-Maurice River on the eastern shore); and St. Joseph road through the village of Saint-Joseph-de-Mékinac along the Mékinac River, reaching the Quebec Route 155 near the mouth of that river. The path of almost all other roads goes along the rivers. Generally, each route is designated as the place name of the headwater lake that feeds it:
 Road Lake-to-sleighs (along the discharge of lakes Grobois, Lemere and the sleighs);
 Path of the domain Batchelder;
 Path of Mékinac Lake (along the Mékinac Lake, on the west side);
 Path of the river and road Crows (linking Vincent Lake);
 Lake Road Dumont (Dumont bypassing the lake, by the west bank);
 Path of Missionary Lake, which is segmented into two, the first segment links Saint-Joseph-de-Mékinac to the northern part of the lake and the second segment link the southern part of the lake, to Hervey-Jonction, Quebec;
 Road of the lake of the Otters;
 Lejeune Road;
 Vlimeux Lake Road.

Demographics
Population trend:
 Population in 2021: 512 (2016 to 2021 population change: 29.3%)
 Population in 2016: 396 
 Population in 2011: 490 
 Population in 2006: 411
 Population in 2001: 469
 Population in 1996: 454
 Population in 1991: 516

Private dwellings occupied by usual residents: 288 (total dwellings: 544)

Mother tongue:
 English as first language: 1%
 French as first language: 99%
 English and French as first language: 0%
 Other as first language: 0%

Mayors

Trois-Rives has been represented by a mayor since 1978.  The following is a list of mayors of Trois-Rives.

Political representation 

Provincially it is part of the riding of Laviolette–Saint-Maurice. In the 2022 Quebec general election the incumbent MNA Marie-Louise Tardif, of the Coalition Avenir Québec, was re-elected to represent the population of Trois-Rives in the National Assembly of Quebec.

Federally, Trois-Rives is part of the federal riding of Saint-Maurice—Champlain. In the 2021 Canadian federal election, the incumbent François-Philippe Champagne of the Liberal Party was re-elected to represent the population Trois-Rives in the House of Commons of Canada.

See also

 Mékinac dam (Québec)
 Rivière du Milieu (Mékinac)
 Lejeune Township
 Mékinac (township)

Further reading

 "Cent ans d'histoire en r'montant la rivière..." ("One hundred years of history up river..."), published in 1988 during the centenary of the parish of Saint-Joseph-de-Mékinac, written by Francine Juneau, in collaboration with Jeanne Desrosiers. Second edition, 300 pages, over 900 photos. This book describes the history of the parish and families of Saint-Joseph. This reissue features the same content as the first edition, adding a different binding.
 Mariages de St-Séverin-de-Proulxville, 1889-1984, St-Timothée-de-Hérouxville, 1898-1981, St-Jacques-des-Piles, Grandes-Piles, 1885-1985, St-Jean-des-Piles, 1898-1980, St-Joseph-de-Mékinac, 1895-1985, St-Roch-de-Mékinac, 1904-1981, St-Théodore-de-la-Grande-Anse, 1904-1929. Crête, Georges, Ste-Foy, G. Crête, 1987.

References

External links

  
 Official web site of the Mékinac Regional County Municipality 

Incorporated places in Mauricie
Municipalities in Quebec
Mékinac Regional County Municipality